Cecil George Mercer was an Ontario political figure. He represented Durham in the Legislative Assembly of Ontario from 1937 to 1943 as a Liberal member.

References

External links 
 Ontario Legislative Assembly Members

Ontario Liberal Party MPPs